The Aure is a river in northwestern France, in the department of Calvados. Its source is in Caumont-l'Éventé, and it flows into the river Vire in Isigny-sur-Mer. The largest town on the Aure is Bayeux.

History
In modern history, crossing of the Aure is noted in the advances of units of infantry of the United States as they undertook liberation of France from Germany in June, 1944. The river leads to a small mill that formerely was used to make cotton.

Hydrology and water quality
The Aure river has relatively high turbidity and its brownish water is moderate in velocity due to the slight gradient of the watercourse, although the narrow channel in locations like Bayeux centre engenders higher surface velocities; pH levels have been measured at 8.35 in the centre of Bayeux near the Bayeux Tapestry Museum and electrical conductivity of the waters have tested at 37 micro-siemens per centimetre. Turbidity has been measured at 13 centimetres by the Secchi disc method.

Tributaries

Le Lieu Gueroult (ruisseau)
Ruisseau de la Baronnie
Le Vession (ruisseau)
L'Aurette (L)
Ruisseau de Fumichon
Ruisseau du Ponchot
La Drôme (L) ~ 58 km long ~ its main affluent
Le Cachiau (ruisseau)
Le Douet du Val (ruisseau)
Le Douet de Riloques (ruisseau)
Le Douet de Courtelay (ruisseau)
La Tortonne (L)
L'Esque (L)
Ruisseau du Moulin Dannebey
Ruisseau de la Bellaie

References

Rivers of France
Rivers of Normandy
Rivers of Calvados (department)